Guilford Mill, also known as the Old Mill of Guilford and Bailes' Old Mill, is a historic grist mill located near Oak Ridge, Guilford County, North Carolina. It was built in 1822, and is a plain three-story, heavy timber frame building on a fieldstone foundation.  It has a gable roof and one-story, shed roofed addition built of fieldstone.  The grist mill is powered by an overshot wheel.

It was listed on the National Register of Historic Places in 1982.

References

Grinding mills in North Carolina
Grinding mills on the National Register of Historic Places in North Carolina
Industrial buildings completed in 1822
Buildings and structures in Guilford County, North Carolina
National Register of Historic Places in Guilford County, North Carolina
1822 establishments in North Carolina